The World Group II was the second highest level of Fed Cup competition in 2006. Winning nations advanced to the World Group Play-offs, and the losing nations were demoted to the World Group II Play-offs.

Japan vs. Switzerland

Croatia vs. Argentina

Thailand vs. Czech Republic

Indonesia vs. China

References

See also
Fed Cup structure

World Group II